The Louisiana Center for Women in Government and Business Hall of Fame recognizes women natives or residents of the U.S. state of Louisiana for their significant achievements or statewide contributions. Among the inductees are men whose contributions to supporting strong women were deemed significant. The Center is headquartered at Nicholls State University in Thibodaux and was established in 1991 to promote and encourage government and public service leadership of women. The first Hall of Fame inductions occurred in March 1994 during Women's History Month.

Inductees

See also
Louisiana Political Museum and Hall of Fame

References

External links
Louisiana Center for Women in Government and Business
List of Inductees from 1994 to 2009

Women's halls of fame
Lists of American women
State halls of fame in the United States
Businesspeople halls of fame
1991 establishments in Louisiana
Halls of fame in Louisiana
Nicholls State University
University museums in Louisiana
History of women in Louisiana